Noah are an Indonesian alternative pop/rock band. Noah were founded under the name Peterpan in Bandung, West Java on 1 December 2000 by Ariel (vocals), Andika (keyboard), Indra (bass), Lukman (guitar), Reza (drum) and Uki (guitar). After Andika and Indra split from the band in 2006, David (keyboard) became a band member in 2008. The band proceeded to abandon the Peterpan name and performed as "Ariel, Uki, Lukman, Reza, David" in 2009, before announcing their new name, Noah, in 2012. With nine million albums sold in Indonesia as of 2015, Noah are regarded as the best-selling alternative pop/rock band in the country.

In 2003, Peterpan released their first studio album, Taman Langit, which won SCTV Music Awards for best newcomer's album. Their second album, Bintang di Surga, was released in 2004 and is one of best-selling albums in Indonesia. The album won Best of the Best Album award and the title track won Best of the Best Production Work in 2005 Anugerah Musik Indonesia. In international awards, Peterpan won MTV Asia Awards for Favorite Artist Indonesia in 2005 and 2006. After changing their name to Noah, the band remained successful, with their first album under the new name, Seperti Seharusnya (2012), selling over one million copies dan won Best of the Best Album in 2013 Anugerah Musik Indonesia, while the album's lead single, "Separuh Aku", won Best of the Best Production Work in the same ceremony. In 2013, 2014 and 2015, Noah was nominated for Best Southeast Asian Act category in MTV Europe Music Awards. In 2020, Noah won another Anugerah Musik Indonesia award for Best of the Best Album for Keterkaitan Keterikatan (2019).

100% Ampuh Awards

|-
| rowspan= "2" | 2013
| Noah
| Best Band
| 
|-
| "Separuh Aku"
| Best Song
| 
|-

Anugerah Era
The Anugerah Era (English translation: Era Awards) was an award presented from 2001 to 2007. The award was for Radio Era listeners to choose their favorite artist. Noah received two awards from four nominations.

|-
| rowspan= "3" | 2005
| Peterpan
| Best Band
| 
|-
| rowspan= "2" | "Mungkin Nanti"
| Best Rock Song
| 
|-
| ERA Chart Awards
| 
|-
| 2006
| Peterpan
| Best Band
| 
|-

Anugerah Industri Muzik
The Anugerah Industri Muzik (English translation: Music Industry Awards), commonly known by the acronym AIM, is the award ceremony to honour the Malaysian music industry, first held in 1993. It is Malaysia's equivalent of the Grammy Awards.

|-
| 2005
| Alexandria
| Best Indonesia Album
| 
|-

Anugerah Musik Indonesia
The Anugerah Musik Indonesia (English translation: Indonesian Music Awards), is an annual Indonesian major music award. They have been compared to the American Grammy Awards and British Brit Awards. The award was formalized in 1997 by ASIRI (Association of Indonesia Recording Industry), PAPPRI (Association of Indonesian Singers, Songwriters and Music Record Producers), and KCI (Copyright Office of Indonesia). It is the highest music award given to outstanding artists in Indonesia. Noah received fourteen awards from 32 nominations.

!
|-
| rowspan= "6" | 2005
| rowspan= "2" | "Ada Apa Denganmu"
| Best Pop Duo/Collaboration/Group
| 
| 
|-
| Best Pop Song
| 
| 
|-
| "Ku Katakan Dengan Indah"
| Best Alternative Pop Duo/Collaboration/Group
| 
| 
|-
| rowspan= "2" | Bintang di Surga
| Best Alternative Pop Album
| 
| 
|-
| Best Album Production Work
| 
| 
|-
| "Bintang di Surga"
| Best of the Best Production Work
| 
| 
|-
| rowspan= "4" | 2008
| rowspan= "2" | "Di Balik Awan"
| Best Pop Duo/Collaboration/Group
| 
|-
| Best Pop Recording Producer
| 
|-
| rowspan= "2" | Hari Yang Cerah
| Best Pop Album
| 
|-
| Best Recording Album Producer
| 
|-
| rowspan= "10" | 2013
| rowspan= "4" | "Separuh Aku"
| Best Pop Duo/Group
| 
| 
|-
| Best Pop/Urban Recording Producer
| 
| 
|-
| Best of the Best Production Work
| 
| 
|-
| Best Pop Song
| 
|-
| rowspan= "3" | "Cobalah Mengerti" (feat. Momo Geisha)
| Best Pop/Urban Duo/Group
| 
| 
|-
| Best Mix Engineer
| 
|-
| Best Collaboration Production Work
| 
|-
| rowspan= "3" | Seperti Seharusnya
| Best Pop/Urban Album
| 
| 
|-
| Best of the Best Album
| 
| 
|-
| Best Recording Album Producer
| 
|-
| rowspan= "6" | 2015
| rowspan= "2" | "Hero"
| Best Pop Duo/Group
| 
| 
|-
| Best Pop Recording Producer
| 
|-
| "Seperti Kemarin"
| Best Pop Songwriter
| 
|-
| rowspan= "3" | Second Chance
| Best Pop Album
| 
|-
| Best Recording Album Producer
| 
|-
| Best of the Best Album
| 
|-
| rowspan= "6" | 2016
| "Sajadah Panjang"
| Best Pop Duo/Group
| 
|-
| "Tak Terlupakan" (feat. Iwan Fals)
| Best Rock Duo/Group/Collaboration
| 
| 
|-
| "Ku Tunggu Kau Putus" (Ariel Noah and Sheryl Sheinafia)
| Best Pop Collaboration
| 
|-
| rowspan= "3" | Satu (with Iwan Fals, Nidji, Geisha and D'Masiv)
| Best Pop Album
| 
|-
| Best of the Best Album
| 
|-
| Best Album Recording Producer
| 
|-
| 2018
| "Jalani Mimpi"
| Best Alternative Production Work
| 
| 
|-
| 2019
| "Wanitaku"
| Best Pop Duo/Group
| 
| 
|-
| rowspan=6 | 2020
| rowspan=3 | Keterkaitan Keterikatan
| Best of the Best Album
| 
| 
|-
| Best Pop Album
| 
| 
|-
| Best Graphic Album Design
| 
| 
|-
| rowspan=3 | "Kala Cinta Menggoda"
| Best of the Best Production Work
| 
| 
|-
| Best Pop Duo/Group
| 
| 
|-
| Best Rearrangement Production Work
| 
|

Anugerah Planet Muzik
The Anugerah Planet Muzik (English translation: Planet Music Awards) is an annual award given to the most popular artists from Indonesia, Singapore, and Malaysia. Noah received five awards from 24 nominations.

|-
| 2004
| rowspan= "2" | Peterpan
| Best New Group/Duo
| 
|-
| rowspan= "2" | 2005
| Most Popular Group Artist
| 
|-
| "Bintang Di Surga"
| rowspan= "2" | Best Duo/Group
| 
|-
| rowspan= "5" | 2006
| "Tak Bisakah"
| 
|-
| Peterpan
| Most Popular Group Artist
| 
|-
| Alexandria
| Best Album
| 
|-
| "Mungkin Nanti"
| rowspan= "2" | Most Popular Song
| 
|-
| "Ada Apa Denganmu"
| 
|-
| 2007
| rowspan= "2" | Peterpan
| rowspan= "2" | Most Popular Group
| 
|-
| rowspan= "2" | 2008
| 
|-
| "Menghapus Jejakmu"
| Most Popular Song
| 
|-
| rowspan= "5" | 2013
| rowspan= "3" | "Separuh Aku"
| Best Band
| 
|-
| Best Song (Indonesia)
| 
|-
| Most Popular Regional Song
| 
|-
| rowspan= "2" | Noah
| Most Popular Regional Artist
| 
|-
| Social Media Icon
| 
|-
| rowspan= "5" | 2014
| "Tak Lagi Sama"
| Best Band
| 
|-
| "Ini Cinta"
| Best Song (Indonesia)
| 
|-
| "Hidup Untukmu Mati Tanpamu"
| APM Most Popular Song
| 
|-
| rowspan= "2" | Noah
| APM Most Popular Artist
| 
|-
| Social Media Icon
| 
|-
| rowspan= "3" | 2015
| rowspan= "2" | "Seperti Kemarin"
| Best Band
| 
|-
| Best Song (Indonesia)
| 
|-
| Noah
| Social Media Icon
| 
|-
| 2016
| "Para Penerka" (feat. Iwan Fals)
| Best Duo/Group
| 
|-
| 2018
| "Jalani Mimpi"
| Best Band
|

Ardan Group Awards

|-
| 2013
| Noah (9125 times play in a year)
| Most Widely Played Song 
| 
|-

Asia Song Festival
The Asia Song Festival an annual pop music festival held in South Korea that features artists from 10 Asian countries. Participating artists receive a plaque of appreciation from the Korean Ministry of Culture, Sports and Tourism and ‘Best Asian Artist Award’ from the chairman of Korea Foundation for International Culture and Exchange. This festival is recorded and broadcast by Korean SBS, Japanese Fuji TV and 30 other broadcasters worldwide. Noah is the first band had to performed in Asian festival. Noah received one award.

|-
| 2007
| Peterpan
| Best Contribution Award 
| 
|-

Billboard Indonesia Music Awards 
Billboard Indonesia Music Awards are an music awards show, presented by Billboard Indonesia. Noah have received two awards from two nominations.

|-
|align="center" rowspan="2" | 2020
| Noah
|Top Duo/Group/Band of the Year
| 
|-
| "Wanitaku"
|Top Radio Airplay of the Year
|

Bintang RPTI Awards

|-
| rowspan= "2" | 2012
| Noah 5 Negara 2 Benua
| Favorite Music Concert Program
| 
|-
| Noah
| Celebrity Top Rating of the Year
| 
|-

Class Mild Awards
The Class Mild Awards is an exclusive award for Indonesian musicians. The winners are selected by a jury of music critics, musicians, and journalists. Noah received one award.

|-
| 2009
| Peterpan
| Talk Less Do More Award 
| 
|-

Dahsyatnya Awards
The Dahsyatnya Awards are annual awards presented by the daily Indonesian TV show Dahsyat that airs on RCTI. Noah received six awards from 23 nominations.

|-
| rowspan= "4" | 2009
| Peterpan
| Outstanding Band 
| 
|-
| "Walau Habis Terang"
| Outstanding Video Clip 
| 
|-
| Ariel – "Walau Habis Terang" (Peterpan)
| Outstanding Role in Video Clip
| 
|-
| "Kisah Cintaku"
| Outstanding Song
| 
|-
| rowspan= "3" | 2010
| rowspan= "2" | "Tak Ada Yang Abadi"
| Outstanding Video Clip
| 
|-
| Outstanding Director Video Clip
| 
|-
| Peterpan  – "Tak Ada Yang Abadi" (Peterpan)
| Outstanding Role in Video Clip
| 
|-
| rowspan= "5" | 2013
| Noah
| Outstanding Band 
| 
|-
| rowspan= "3" | "Separuh Aku"
| Outstanding Song
| 
|-
| Outstanding Video Clip
| 
|-
| Outstanding Director Video Clip
| 
|-
| Ariel – "Separuh Aku" (Noah)
| Outstanding Model Video Clip
| 
|-
| rowspan= "2" | 2014
| Noah
| Outstanding Band
| 
|-
| "Hidup Untukmu Mati Tanpamu"
| Outstanding Song
| 
|-
| rowspan= "4" | 2015
| rowspan= "2" | "Hero"
| Outstanding Video Clip
| 
|-
| Outstanding Director Video Clip
| 
|-
| rowspan= "2" | "Ini Cinta"
| Outstanding Video Clip
| 
|-
| Outstanding Director Video Clip
| 
|-
| rowspan= "4" | 2016
| Noah
| Outstanding Band
| 
|-
| rowspan= "2" | "Menunggumu"
| Outstanding Video Clip
| 
|-
| rowspan= "2" | Outstanding Video Clip Director
| 
|-
| "Suara Pikiranku"
| 
|-
| 2017
| Noah
| Outstanding Band
| 
|-

Fokus Selebriti Awards

|-
| 2013
| Ariel Noah & Sophia Latjuba
| Hottest News
| 
|-

Global Seru Awards
The Global Seru Awards are awarded to celebrities who have caught the attention of the public through interesting or exciting accomplishments.

|-
| 2014
| rowspan= "2" | Noah
| Most Exciting Stage Act
| 
|-
| 2015
| Most Exciting Hit
| 
|-

Grazia Glitz & Glam Awards

|-
| 2012
| Noah
| The Hits Celebrity
| 
|-

Hai Reader's Poll Music Awards
The Hai Reader's Poll Music Awards were presented by Indonesian magazine online Hai and to honour for artist in music. Noah received three awards from 6 nominations.

|-
| rowspan= "3" | 2012
| Noah
| The Best Pop 
| 
|-
| Seperti Seharusnya
| The Best Album 
| 
|-
| "Separuh Aku"
| The Best Single
| 
|-
| 2013
| Noah
| The Best Pop 
| 
|-
| 2014
| "Hero"
| The Best Single
| 
|-
| 2015
| Noah
| The Best Pop
| 
|-

I Gosip

|-
| 2008
| Peterpan
| Most Sensational Band
| 
|-

Inbox Awards
The Inbox Awards are awarded to honour for artist in music and entertainment and presented by Inbox on SCTV. Noah received one award from 3 nominations.

|-
| rowspan= "2" | 2012
| "Dara"
| rowspan= "2" | Most Inbox Video Clip
| 
|-
| "Cobalah Mengerti" (feat. Momo Geisha)
| 
|-
| 2016
| Noah
| Most Inbox Band
| 
|-

Indonesian Movie Awards
The Indonesian Movie Awards have been awarded to films since 2007.

|-
| 2007
| "Tak Bisakah" (Alexandria)
| Favorite Soundtrack
| 
|-
| 2010
| Nazril Irham (Sang Pemimpi)
| Best Newcomer Actor
| 
|-

Infotainment Awards
The Infotainment Awards is an award presented by SCTV since 2012. Noah received three awards from 11 nominations.

|-
| rowspan= "3" | 2013
| Ariel Noah
| Most Lure Male Celebrity
| 
|-
| Noah
| Most Awaited Celebrity Appearance
| 
|-
| Konser Noah 2 Benua 5 Negara (Born to Make History)
| Most Phenomenal World of Entertainment Events
| 
|-
| rowspan= "4" | 2014
| rowspan= "6"| Ariel Noah
| Most Lure Male Celebrity
| 
|-
| Most Awaited Celebrity Appearance
| 
|-
| Most Fashionable Male Celebrity
| 
|-
| Celebrity of the Year
| 
|-
| rowspan= "3" | 2015
| Most Lure Male Celebrity
| 
|-
| Sexiest Dad
| 
|-
| rowspan= "2" | David Noah & Gracia Indri
| rowspan= "2" | Most Phenomenal Celebrity Wedding
| 
|-
| 2016
| 
|-

Insert

Insert Awards

|-
| 2012
| rowspan= "3" | Ariel Noah
| rowspan= "2" | Sexiest Male Celebrity 
| 
|-
| 2013
| 
|-
| 2014
| The Iconic Celebrity
| 
|-

Insert Fashion Awards

|-
| 2015
| Noah
| Most Fashionable Group Band 
| 
|-

Johnny Andrean Awards

|-
| 2010
| Ariel Peterpan
| The Best Hair Do for Male Singer 
| 
|-

KLIK! Awards

|-
| 2013
| "Separuh Aku"
| Favorite Pop Video
| 
|-

Maya Awards
The Maya Awards (Indonesian translation: Piala Maya), is an annual Indonesian film awards initiated in 2012 by Indonesian online film enthusiasts, that is initiated by @FILM_Indonesia Twitter account. It follows the concept of similar awards, with nominations and awards given to each year's best local productions. Noah received one award from 2 nominations.

|-
| rowspan= "2" | 2013
| rowspan= "2" | Noah: Awal Semula
| Best Feature Film
| 
|-
| Best Editing 
| 
|-

MTV Awards

MTV Ampuh

|-
| rowspan= "4" | 2004
| "Ada Apa Denganmu"
| Song of the Year
| 
|-
| Peterpan
| Group/Duo Artist of the Year
| 
|-

MTV Asia Awards
The MTV Asia Awards is a show that gives recognition and awards for Asian and international in achievements in cinema, fashion, humanitarian pursuits, and music. Most of the awards are voted for by viewers from the Asian region. Noah received three awards.

|-
| rowspan= "2" | 2005
| Peterpan
| Favorite Artist Indonesia
| 
|-
| Bintang di Surga
| Most Sold Album of the Year 
| 
|-
| 2006
| Peterpan
| Favorite Artist Indonesia
| 
|-

MTV Europe Music Awards
The MTV Europe Music Awards are awarded by MTV Networks Europe to popular music videos in Europe. The awards are chosen by European MTV viewers. Since 2011, other worldwide/regional nominations have been added. The awards are presented annually and broadcast live on MTV Europe, MTV Live HD and most of the international MTV channels as well as online.

|-
| 2013
| rowspan= "3" | Noah
| rowspan= "3" | Best Southeast Asian Act
| 
|-
| 2014
| 
|-
| 2015
| 
|-

MTV Indonesia Awards
The MTV Indonesia Awards are presented by MTV Indonesia, as chosen by their viewers throughout Indonesia. Noah received three awards from 5 nominations.

|-
| 2005
| Bintang di Surga
| Most Selling Album of the Year
| 
|-
| rowspan= "3" | 2006
| rowspan= "2" | "Bintang di Surga"
| Video of the Year
| 
|-
| rowspan= "2" | Best Director
| 
|-
| "Menunggu Pagi"
| 
|-
| 2009
| Peterpan
| Most Inspiring Artist 
| 
|-

MTV Indonesia Movie Awards
The MTV Indonesia Movie Awards is an awards show in Indonesia similar to the MTV Movie Awards.

|-
| 2006
| "Tak Bisakah" (Alexandria)
| Best Song in Movie
| 
|-

Nickelodeon Indonesia Kids' Choice Awards
The Nickelodeon Indonesia Kids' Choice Awards is Indonesian version of Nickelodeon Kids' Choice Awards, held since 2008 in Jakarta. Noah received two awards from 5 nominations.

|-
| 2009
| Peterpan
| rowspan= "3" | Favorite Band 
| 
|-
| 2013
| rowspan= "4" | Noah
| 
|-
| 2014
| 
|-
| 2015
| Favorite Group/Band/Duo
| 
|-
| 2017
| Favorite Singer
| 
|-

Oz Radio Bandung FM Awards
The Oz Radio Bandung FM Awards are an online radio awards were presented by OZ Radio FM, for talent musician/singer who have listed of 'friendly' in music. 

|-
| rowspan= "3" | 2017
| Noah
| Most Friendly Band
| 
|-
| "Andaikan Kau Datang"
| Most Friendly Cover/Recycle
| 
|-
| "Yang Terlupakan" (feat. Iwan Fals)
| Most Friendly Collaboration
| 
|-

Pop Awards
The Pop Awards are an awards for celebrities which popular and also inspire for young generation. It is a first established in RCTI.

|-
| 2016
| Ariel Noah
| Male Pop Awards
| 
|-

Rolling Stones Editors' Choice Awards
The Rolling Stones Editors' Choice Awards are an annual awards were created by Rolling Stone Indonesia magazine for outstanding contribution and achievement which their earning in popular culture. Noah has received one award.

|-
| 2009
| "Ku Katakan Dengan Indah"
| Best Song
| 
|-

SCTV Awards
The SCTV Awards is an award given by the Indonesian television station SCTV, based on the audience's votes. Noah received five awards from 12 nominations.

|-
| 2005
| rowspan= "5" | Peterpan
| rowspan= "9" | Famous Group Band
| 
|-
| 2006
| 
|-
| 2007
| 
|-
| 2008
| 
|-
| 2009
| 
|-
| 2012
| rowspan= "4" | Noah
| 
|-
| 2013
| 
|-
| 2014
| 
|-
| rowspan= "3" | 2015
| 
|-
| "Menunggumu" (Ganteng-Ganteng Serigala Return)
| rowspan= "2" | Famous Soap Opera Soundtrack
| 
|-
| "Tak Bisakah" (Ganteng-Ganteng Serigala Return)
| 
|-
| 2016
| Noah
| Famous Group Band
| 
|-

SCTV Music Awards
The SCTV Music Awards is an award given by Indonesian television station SCTV for the most popular songs, albums, and artists based on the audience's votes. Noah has received ten awards from 26 nominations.

|-
| 2004
| Taman Langit
| Famous Newcomer Album 
| 
|-
| rowspan= "2" | 2005
| Bintang di Surga
| Famous Pop Group Album 
| 
|-
| "Ku Katakan Dengan Indah"
| Most Famous Song 
| 
|-
| 2006
| Alexandria
| Famous Pop Duo/Group Album 
| 
|-
| rowspan= "5" | 2009
| Sebuah Nama Sebuah Cerita
| Famous Pop Duo/Group Album
| 
|-
| "Kisah Cintaku"
| Most Famous Song
| 
|-
| Reza Peterpan
| Favorite Drummer Player
| 
|-
| Uki Peterpan
| Favorite Guitarist Player
| 
|-
| Ariel Peterpan
| Favorite Vocalist Band
| 
|-
| rowspan= "6" | 2013
| Noah
| Most Famous Duo/Group Band 
| 
|-
| "Separuh Aku"
| Most Famous Song
| 
|-
| Ariel Noah
| Most Famous Vocalist Band 
| 
|-
| Loekman Noah
| Most Famous Guitar Player
| 
|-
| David Noah
| Most Famous Keyboard Player 
| 
|-
| Reza Noah
| Most Famous Drum Player
| 
|-
| rowspan= "5" | 2014
| Noah
| Most Famous Duo/Group Band 
| 
|-
| Ariel Noah
| Most Famous Vocalist Band 
| 
|-
| Uki Noah
| Most Famous Guitar Player
| 
|-
| David Noah
| Most Famous Keyboard Player
| 
|-
| Reza Noah
| Most Famous Drum Player
| 
|-
| rowspan= "2" | 2015
| Ariel Noah
| Most Famous Vocalist Band
| 
|-
| David Noah
| Most Famous Keyboard Player
| 
|-
| rowspan= "3" | 2016
| Noah
| Most Famous Duo/Group Band
| 
|-
| "Yang Terlupakan" (feat. Iwan Fals)
| rowspan= "2" | Most Famous Collaboration
| 
|-
| "Kutunggu Kau Putus" (Ariel Noah & Sheryl Sheinafia)
| 
|-
| 2017
| Noah
| Most Famous Group Band
| 
|-

Silet Awards
The Silet Awards is an annual awards show held by the infotainment show Silet for artists and shows broadcast on RCTI.

|-
| 2014
| Ariel Noah & Sophia Latjuba
| Razored Romance
| 
|-

World Music Awards
The World Music Awards is an international awards show founded in 1989 under the patronage of Albert II, Prince of Monaco and based in Monte Carlo. Awards are presented to the world's best selling artist in various categories and to the best-selling artist from each major territory. Sales figures are provided by the International Federation of the Phonographic Industry.

|-
| rowspan= "6" | 2014
| rowspan= "2" | Ariel Noah
| World's Best Male Artist
| 
|-
| World's Best Entertainer of the Year
| 
|-
| rowspan= "2" | Noah
| World's Best Group
| 
|-
| World's Best Live Act
| 
|-
| "Jika Engkau"
| World's Best Video
| 
|-

Yahoo! OMG Awards
Established in 2012, the Yahoo! OMG Awards are an awards were presented by Yahoo! Indonesia to honour for celebrities in music, film, news and television, based on voted online by fans in Yahoo! websites. Noah has received two awards from 6 nominations.

|-
| rowspan= "2" | 2012
| Ariel Noah & Luna Maya
| Most Shocking Break-Up
| 
|-
| rowspan= "2" | Noah
| Band of the Year
| 
|-
| rowspan= "2" | 2013
| Best Group
| 
|-
| Uki Noah
| rowspan= "2" | Sexiest Dad
| 
|-
| rowspan= "2" | 2014
| Ariel Noah
| 
|-
| Ariel Noah & Sophia Latjuba
| Favorite Couple
| 
|-

Honor Awards, Magazine, Newspaper

Bintang Magazine

|-
| 2012
| Noah
| Star of the Year
| 
|-

Hai Magazine

|-
| 2002
| Peterpan
| Rookie of the Year
| 
|-

MURI Records

|-
| 2004
| Peterpan
| Record for Performing in Six Cities in 24 Hours
| 
|-
| 2012
| Noah
| Record for Concert 5 Countries, 2 Continent, 24 Hours
| 
|-

Musica Studio Indonesia

|-
| 2004
| Taman Langit
| Triple Platinum Award
| 
|-
| 2013
| Seperti Seharusnya
| Multi Platinum Award
| 
|-

References

Noah
Awards